Norman K. Carlberg (November 6, 1928 – November 11, 2018) was an American sculptor, photographer, and printmaker. He is noted as an exemplar of the modular constructivist style.

Early life and education
Carlberg was born in Roseau, Minnesota. He was the son of Gustav Carlberg and his wife Alma Forsberg. He studied at the Minneapolis School of Art and then enlisted in the Air Force.  He finished his undergraduate and graduate degree in art at the Yale School of Art under Josef Albers, who was instrumental in his acceptance as a student at Yale and his nomination for a Fulbright Fellowship to teach at Pontifical Catholic University of Chile.  During his time in Chile, Norman became good friends with Sergio Castillo, and others who spent time in the Barrio Bellavista bohemian quarter of Santiago, such as Manfred Max-Neef.  Besides Josef Albers, Robert Engman was a huge influence as a teacher and later as a good friend. Norman died 11 November 2018.

Exhibitions and career
Carlberg enjoyed a number of exhibitions throughout his career that ranged from one-man shows to group exhibits.  A selected list include the following:

 - 1959 exhibition at the Museum of Modern Art, “Recent Sculpture USA", featured Carlberg's work. 
 - 1960 Chilean National Museum of Fine Arts, Santiago, Chile, “LXXI Salon Oficial”
 - 1962 Whitney Museum of American Art, “Whitney Annual”
 - 1966 Baltimore Museum of Art, “Regional Exhibit”; Museum Prize
 - 1974 Carpenter Center, Harvard University, “Art Work by Students of Albers”
 - 1977 Schenectady Museum, “Group Show”
 - 1986 Traveling Exhibition in Italy, “USA-Florence ARToday”
 - 1996 Maryland Art Place, “Retrospective in Parte”
 - 2019 Maryland Institute College of Art, “Retrospective”

Carlberg taught briefly (1960–61) in Santiago, Chile at the Pontifical Catholic University of Chile. In 1961, Eugene Leake hired Norman as the Director of the Rinehart School of Sculpture at the Maryland Institute College of Art (MICA) in Baltimore. He taught at MICA until his retirement in 1997.

Working with architect Harry Seidler

Harry Seidler was an Australian architect who was a leading proponent of Modernism in Australia, and was the first to incorporate key principals of the Bauhaus in his architectural projects in Australia.  As relayed in Kenneth Frampton’s 1992 book on Harry Seidler’s work, Harry “was first introduced to Norman Carlberg’s sculptures in Josef and Anni Alber’s house in America in the 1960s.  They proudly showed me one of his positive reversal pieces in their living room. ‘it really works — doesn’t it?’ said Albers, which was a rare compliment”.  From that indirect introduction to Carlberg’s work, Carlberg and Seidler established a correspondence that led to a friendship, a mutual admiration, and a mutually symbiotic interaction where each was able to beneficially help the other.  In the case of Seidler, the geometric forms of Carlberg’s work (as well as fellow artists Charles O. Perry and Frank Stella) influenced the direction of Seidler’s architectural designs.  Conversely, Seidler had commissioned Carlberg to produce large pieces of artwork that allowed Carlberg to extend his work into a larger scale than he had ever accomplished previously.  One of these project was the Riverside Centre, designed by Harry Seidler and Associates in Brisbane, Australia, which includes a Carlberg piece titled Winter Wind - a 10 meter high indoor sculpture.

Style: Modular constructivism, minimalism

Carlberg has written: "My style of sculpture represents the movement known as 'modular constructivism', which grew into its maturity and popularity in the 50s and 60s." The "modular" aspect of Carlberg's constructions is often readily apparent to the eye. Carlberg discussed modular constructivism with art critic Brian Sherwin, stating,

Carlberg's sculptures often consist of repetitions of such a unit, a basic shape capable of combining with other such elements in various ways—somewhat in the way a composer such as Bach or Webern might compose a piece of music by exploring the combinatorial possibilities of a single motivic cell, working within implicit constraints. At Yale, Erwin Hauer was an important influence who prodded Carlberg in this stylistic direction. While both men often employed curvilinear forms as modules, Carlberg more often used relatively geometric, hard-edged design units, often combining curves with straight edges (or flat planes) in the same module. His prints, mostly dating after 1970, show a similar preoccupation with precision, simplicity, and modularity. Some are actually groups of prints, placed contiguously together on a wall, with each print conceived as a module.

Another theme that distinguished Carlberg's work in the Constructivism movement was his exploration in the positive-negative contrast of his modular units.  The concept is simple, but its realization into artwork can be challenge in achieving its goal in a subtle manner that does not detract from the piece in its entirety.

Collections
Carlberg's sculptures are in the permanent collections of the Whitney Museum of American Art in New York, the Art and Architecture Gallery at Yale University in New Haven, Connecticut, the Pennsylvania Academy of Fine Arts in Philadelphia, the Hirshhorn Museum, the Guggenheim Museum, the Josef & Anni Albers Foundation, The Art Collection of the First National Bank of Chicago, and the Baltimore Museum of Art, as well as in the private collections of Congressman Tom Foley and author/broadcaster/journalist Robert St. John.

See also
Constructivism (art)
Minimalism
Formalism (art)
Riverside Centre (one of Carlberg's collaborative projects)
Jane Frank (noted student of Carlberg)
Earl Hofmann (MICA art teacher)

Notes

References
 An early and exhaustive treatise on Constructivism is shown in the 1967 book titled "Constructivism: Origins and Evolution", by George Rickey, which starts its examination on the legacy of the movement as it originated in Russia, to the "heirs" of the work that range from Max Bill, Erwin Hauer, Karl Gerstner, Bruno Munari, to Norman Carlberg.
 Primary source of information for this article is the Norman Carlberg profile, a website maintained by the following institutions: the Baltimore Museum of Art; the Enoch Pratt Free Library; Johns Hopkins University; the Maryland Institute College of Art; the Maryland Historical Society; the Maryland State Department of Education; the University of Maryland, Baltimore County; and the Walters Art Museum.
 Carlberg, Norman. Norman Carlberg: an exhibition of sculpture [exhibition catalogue] (Exhibition of sculpture — Norman Carlberg: presented by the Pennsylvania State University College of Arts and Architecture, November 5–29, 1966). ; ; 
 Galerie Chalette. Structured sculpture: December 1960-January 1961 (NYC: The Gallery, 1960) [exhibition catalogue]. 
 Montpelier Cultural Arts Center. Sculpture 2000: the twentieth anniversary of the Montpelier invitational sculpture exhibition, Montpelier Cultural Arts Center, June 8 – August 18, 2000 [exhibition catalogue] (Maryland : Montpelier Cultural Arts Center, 2000). 
Museum of Modern Art (New York, N.Y.). Recent sculpture U.S.A. Sponsored by the [NYC] Junior Council of the Museum of Modern Art (1959).

External links
Color images of large public Carlberg sculpture at Riverside Centre, built by Harry Seidler and Associates in Brisbane, Australia
Hirshhorn Gallery permanent collection listing for Carlberg's "Minimal Surface Form 6", 1960.
Ford Foundation Grant recipient listing
Askart.com pages on Norman Carlberg
Pages on Norman Carlberg at g11.org.uk [click on 'sculpture' link at top, for access to both black and white and color images of Carlberg's works]
Fulbright Chile site
Interview with Norman Carlberg at myartspace.com

1928 births
2018 deaths
People from Roseau, Minnesota
20th-century American sculptors
20th-century American male artists
21st-century American sculptors
21st-century American male artists
American male sculptors
Yale School of Art alumni
20th-century American printmakers
Sculptors from Minnesota
Maryland Institute College of Art faculty
American people of Swedish descent
Fulbright alumni